João de Sousa Campos (1813–1880) was a city council member in Campinas from 1849 to 1852. He was one of the founders of the Republican Party of São Paulo in Amparo. He was involved in the management of political affairs and held various offices in local administration.

References

1880 deaths
Republican Party of São Paulo politicians
1813 births
People from Campinas